Transmembrane protein 169 (TMEM169) in humans is encoded by TMEM169 gene. The aliases of TMEM169 include FLJ34263, DKFZp781L2456, and LOC92691. TMEM169 has the highest expression in the brain, particularly the fetal brain.  TMEM169 has homologs mammals, reptiles, amphibians, birds, fish, chordates and invertebrates. The most distantly related homolog of TMEM169 is Anopheles albimanus.

Gene

Locus 
The gene is located on human chromosome 2(2q35) and spans 20,918 bases (216,081,866-216,102,783) on the + strand. The gene contains four exons in total. The direct neighbors of TMEM169 include XRCC5 (X-ray repair cross complementing 5) and PECR (peroxisomal trans-2-enoyl-CoA reductase).

Transcripts 
Transcription of TMEM169 gene produces five alternatively spliced variants to generate four variants of the transcript. The variants all code for the same protein and have differences within the 5’ UTR region. Variant 1 is the longest transcript (NM_001142310.2) and consists of 3,408 base pairs and four exons.

Protein 
All four transcripts encode for the same protein (TMEM169) consisting of 297 amino acids. According to SAPS the molecular weight of protein TMEM169 is 33.6 kdal and it has an overall net negative charge (-5.7%).  TMEM169 has an isoelectric point of 4.76.

Domains 
There are two transmembrane domains of Homo sapiens TMEM169 located at amino acids 160-180 and 211-231. The N and C terminus are both located in the cytoplasmic domain. The conceptual translation provides further annotation of Homo sapiens TMEM169 protein.

Secondary Structure 
The specific structure of TMEM169 is unknown, although includes both alpha helices and beta sheets.

Gene level regulation

Promoter 
The promoter (GXP_6745619) is 1242 base pairs at coordinates 216080866-216082107. It supports 11 coding transcripts. 

Table 2. There are four promoters that result from TMEM169 search on Genomatix.

Expression pattern

RNA sequencing 
RNA sequencing data revealed TMEM169 is expressed ubiquitously, although it displays high expression in the brain, particularly during fetal development. HPA RNA-seq normal tissues for TMEM169 were obtained from 95 human tissue samples. The HPA RNA-seq demonstrates highest expression of TMEM169 in the brain (RPKM=3.159). Particularly, in the fetal brain (RPKM= 1.583) and cerebellum(RPKM=0.795).

NCBI GEO Profile Microarray 
GEO Profile: GDS3113/220527

The highest expression of TMEM169 is found in the fetal brain. TMEM169 tends to have a high expression in the brain relative to other tissues, although not to other genes.

Antibodies 
The use of polyclonal TMEM169 antibody (NBP2-69796) of a human melanoma cell line (SK-MEL-30) in the host of rabbit demonstrates TMEM169 localization to nucleoplasm, cytosol and centrosome. Strong positivity in glial cells is revealed through immunohistochemical staining of the human cerebral cortex with antibody HPA074877.

Protein Level Regulation

Post-transalational modifications 

The MyHits Tool revealed two types of conserved predicted post-translational modifications.

Homology 

TMEM169 is well-conserved across strict orthologs shown by the following multiple sequence alignment created Clustal using BoxShade. The multiple sequence alignment of distant orthologs highlighting the transmembrane domains was also created using Clustal  and BoxShade. The red boxes illustrate conserved transmembrane domains across orthologs.

Orthologs 
Orthologs are found in over 300 organisms within the kingdom metazoan. There are not any orthologs found in fungi or plants. Invertebrates are the most distantly related orthologs, according to BLAST searches. The subset of closely related organisms include mammals, reptiles, birds, and amphibians (E-value 1e-177 to 1e-124). These orthologs range from 78% to 93% sequence similarity to the human protein. Moderately related orthologs to human TMEM169 protein include fish and cephalochordates (similarity= 62%-75%; E-value= 3e-120 to 1e-71). Protein sequences of hemichordates, arthropods, and mollusks are the most distantly related to the human protein sequence (similarity= 56%-64%; E-value= 2e-58 to 1e-44). The most distantly related organism with TMEM169 ortholog is Anopheles albimanus, within the taxonomic group Arthropoda. The size of the gene family for Anopheles albimanus is one and there is only one isoform.

Table 1. Identified orthologs of Homo sapiens TMEM169 protein. The table is organized by increasing DOD (data of divergence from the human lineage) and then by sequence similarity to the human protein (%). The date of divergence was calculated using TimeTree. Seq. is an abbreviation for sequence.

Evolutionary History 
TMEM169 gene first appeared in invertebrates, more specifically in arthropods and mollusks. The approximate date of divergence from humans for arthropods and mollusks is 797 million years ago (MYA). Based upon comparison of the evolution for cytochrome C (a quickly evolving protein) and fibrinogen alpha chain (a slowly evolving protein), TMEM169 gene is evolving at a moderate pace.

Interacting Proteins 
RhoU (rho-related GTP-binding protein RhoU) is known to interact with TMEM169 according to PSICQUIC. The pull down assay revealed RhoU as a protein interaction with TMEM169.

Clinical Relevance- Disease Association 
A single nucleotide polymorphism of TMEM169, defined as rs3821104, is one of two SNP’s that revealed strong association (p<0.1) with Chronic Obstructive Pulmonary Disease (COPD) within the international COPD genetics network. Additionally, gene TMEM169 is one of the four most down-regulated genes in response to oxidative stress; it is downregulated by 0.50 fold in patients with myocardial infarctions. The gene has association to two different birth defects; neural tube defects and preeclampsia. An amino acid change (p.K41I) in TMEM169 is known to cause neural tube defects and hypermethylated loci cg20968678, associated with TMEM169, leads to early onset preeclampsia.

References